The Women's Pacific Tri-Nations tournament was contested in April 2006 at the Teufaiva Park in Nuku’alofa, Tonga. It was the only time the tournament was held.

Samoa had been playing international rugby since 2000, and competed in two World Cups. Fiji and Tonga were making their international debut in women's fifteens.

Although a Samoan victory was hardly unexpected, Fiji pushed them close. Overall the tournament was a success.

Final table

Results

See also
Oceania Rugby Women’s Championship
Women's international rugby union

References

Women's rugby union competitions in Oceania for national teams
Pacific Tri-Nations
Women's Pacific Tri Nations